Jordan Glasgow (born June 28, 1996) is an American football linebacker who is currently a free agent. He played college football at Michigan.

College career
After starting his Michigan career as a walk-on, Glasgow earned a scholarship due to his play on special teams and moved into the starting lineup at linebacker for his senior season.

Professional career

2020 season
Glasgow was selected by the Indianapolis Colts in the sixth round (213th overall) in the 2020 NFL Draft. He was named to the 2020 PFWA All-Rookie Team for his role on special teams.

During the season, he was placed on the reserve/COVID-19 list by the team on December 13, 2020, and activated on December 29.

2021 season
On September 24, 2021, Glasgow was placed on injured reserve with a concussion. He was activated on October 30.

Glasgow was waived on June 9, 2022.

Personal life
Glasgow is the youngest brother of Graham, who is currently a center for the Denver Broncos, and Ryan, who is a retired defensive tackle who most recently played for the New Orleans Saints.

References

External links
Michigan bio

1996 births
Living people
American football linebackers
American football safeties
Indianapolis Colts players
Michigan Wolverines football players
Players of American football from Illinois
Sportspeople from Aurora, Illinois